Whakamana, or The New Zealand Institute for Cannabis Education, Research and Development is New Zealand's first museum dedicated to the history of cannabis use and culture. It was first opened in October 2013 in Dunedin as part of a project spearheaded by Abe Gray, former deputy leader of the Aotearoa Legalise Cannabis Party (ALCP), and Julian Crawford, former ALCP regional spokesperson. 

In 2019 Whakamana relocated to Shand's Emporium in Christchurch as a new project directed by Abe Gray and Cookie Time founder Michael Mayell. 

Following revenue issues and a failure to find suitable investors, the Christchurch location was closed. As of April 2020, Gray is attempting to establish a new site in central Wellington, the capital city of New Zealand. As a political hub which houses New Zealand's parliamentary buildings, Gray considers the location to be more effective in the lead-up to the referendum.

Whakamana was designed to be a national information centre on aspects of the science, history, and legislation surrounding cannabis, with an aim to educate, particularly in the lead up to the 2020 New Zealand cannabis referendum. It operates within New Zealand's laws and does not sell cannabis. However, Whakamana previous stated they would set up a dispensary provided the law allows it to following the referendum.

Under the direction of the 2019 project, Whakamana sought to establish itself as a social club, an authority for cannabis education and events (i.e. lectures by figures in the cannabis industry), and an alcohol-free music venue and eatery producing hemp-based foods. In late 2019, the museum attempted to raise funds via PledgeMe, a crowdfunding platform for New Zealand-based businesses, to help complete restoration of their new site. The campaign failed to raise its minimum target of $1 million NZD, therefore investors were refunded and the campaign was voided.

Early formation  
Originally located in Dunedin, the museum was first operated in the Legalise Cannabis House on David Street. The museum served as an information service to educate the public about all aspects of cannabis, including books that are unavailable at other libraries. In addition to acting as a museum and serving as a centre for drug law reform advocacy, the museum promoted open-source computer software. It also featured meeting rooms and a digital multimedia studio.

The museum was opened in 2013 by Abe Gray, known for his cannabis activism as the former deputy leader of the Aotearoa Legalise Cannabis Party and leader of cannabis lobby group Otago NORML, and Julian Crawford, the former ALCP regional spokesperson. It was reportedly a venture between the ALCP and Otago NORML. Dunedin has had a long history of advocacy for marijuana law reform largely through the latter organisation.

Gray, who is originally from the United States of America, has a Masters in Botany. He has spoken out about the discrimination of cannabis users and has been described as a lobbyist and an activist for cannabis. Gray publicly left his role as the president of the ALCP to support The Opportunities Party (TOP) in 2017, believing the organisation to be the most viable political platform to help effect cannabis law change at the time. Gray hoped that support from former ALCP voters would help TOP to enter parliament without requiring an electorate seat. Gareth Morgan, then the party leader, praised Gray for supporting the party's Real Deal Cannabis reform. 

In 2018 the museum left its original home in South Dunedin to occupy a new central city premises in the Eldon Chambers Building in Princes Street.  During this time, comedian Guy Williams documented the museum in a segment for the comedy programme Jono and Ben. Gray stated that the presence of the museum in Dunedin would put it in the ideal position to become a centre for cannabis tourism should the drug ever be legalised in New Zealand, referencing the city's history of support for law change relating to drug use and possession. However, the museum moved again in 2019, this time to Christchurch; Gray had hoped to keep a branch of the museum running in Dunedin, but found the idea unsustainable due to a reliance on volunteers.

2019 Christchurch project 

In mid-2019 the museum left Dunedin and relocated to Christchurch. Gray teamed with Michael Mayell, a social entrepreneur and environmentalist known for founding the snack company Cookie Time. Mayell has an interest in the emerging hemp economy and argues that it could allow New Zealand to reduce its reliance on dairy farming.

The museum was housed in Shand's Emporium building on Manchester Street in Christchurch, having been relocated from its original site in Hereford Street and adjoined to the neighbouring Trinity Church, with plans to restore the church as the central space for the museum. Both buildings are among the oldest in Christchurch and had required restoration following the 2011 Christchurch Earthquake.

The organisation operated a Cannabis Social Club, which was New Zealand's only functioning club in 2019. In 2020 the club raised funds to move to an independent location with the help of Whakamana.

Whakamana had intended to establish an education centre to provide public access to science, literature, and experiences to promote cannabis education. The museum held hosted events featuring notable individuals and experts on cannabis including activist and green fairy Rose Renton.

In May 2020, Mayell revealed that revenue issues had forced the museum to close its Christchurch location. Whakamana would move to Wellington in the form of a new project. The building remains in the hands of the Christchurch Heritage Trust.

Crowdfunding campaign  
In a press release, Gray and Mayell announced plans to raise $1 million NZD via the crowdfunding platform PledgeMe to complete the church restoration and expand their services and resources, offering one share per dollar at a minimum of fifty shares. The campaign went live in late 2019.

By the end of the fundraising period the campaign had raised $214,616 (NZD) from 299 people. However, the campaign had failed to raise its minimum target of $1 million NZD, therefore the total amount was returned to investors in accordance with the terms of PledgeMe. Gray initially attributed the failure of the campaign to a lack of awareness about the project among the local cannabis community, but argued in a later interview that prevailing cannabis stigma had played a role.

Following the failure of the campaign, Gray and Mayell said they were approaching investors and seeking alternative means of funding, and would seek overseas investors if suitable New Zealand investors could not be found.

2020 Wellington project 
In January 2020, Whakamana Museum posted on their Facebook page that they were seeking volunteers to set up a temporary pop-up museum in Wellington, intending to keep it running until the 2020 New Zealand cannabis referendum is resolved. Gray moved to Wellington to facilitate the project. Whakamana had planned to have a location set up in time for April, however this was impacted by the COVID-19 pandemic. 

After deciding it was untenable to continuing leasing the Manchester Street premises, Whakamana announced they would close their Christchurch premises permanently to focus resources on the Wellington project.

See more
 Abe Gray
 Cannabis in New Zealand

Notes

References

External links 
 
 
 
 

Cannabis in New Zealand
2013 in cannabis
2019 in cannabis
Cannabis museums
Museums established in 2013
Museums in Dunedin
Museums in Christchurch
Science museums in New Zealand
Buildings and structures in Christchurch
2013 establishments in New Zealand